In enzymology, a cycloeucalenol cycloisomerase is an enzyme that catalyzes the chemical reaction

cycloeucalenol  obtusifoliol

Hence, this enzyme has one substrate, cycloeucalenol, and one product, obtusifoliol.

This enzyme belongs to the family of isomerases, specifically the class of intramolecular lyases.  The systematic name of this enzyme class is cycloeucalenol lyase (cyclopropane-decyclizing). This enzyme is also called cycloeucalenol---obtusifoliol isomerase.  This enzyme participates in biosynthesis of steroids.

References

 
 

EC 5.5.1
Enzymes of unknown structure